The 1926 Mecklenburg-Schwerin state election was held on 6 June 1926 to elect the 50 members of the Landtag of the Free State of Mecklenburg-Schwerin.

Results

References 

Mecklenburg-Schwerin
Elections in Mecklenburg-Western Pomerania